is a former Japanese football player.

Playing career
Kawai was born in Itabashi, Tokyo on July 14, 1978. After graduating from high school, he joined J1 League club Urawa Reds in 1997. However he could not play at all in the match until 1999 and the club was relegated to J2 League end of 1999 season. In 2000, he debuted in May and played many matches as defensive midfielder under manager Kazuo Saito. The club was also returned to J1 end of 2000 season. However Kawai could hardly play in the match under new manager from 2001. He was sacked end of 2002 season.

In 2003, Kawai signed with Yokohama F. Marinos which many Japan national team players played for the club. He could not play at all in the match until summer 2003. However regular center-back Naoki Matsuda was injured summer and Kawai played many matches as center-back instead Matsuda and Marinos won the champions in J1. In 2004, although his opportunity to play decreased, Marinos won the champions for 2 years in a row. In 2005, he became a regular left-back of three back defense with Naoki Matsuda and Yuji Nakazawa. In 2006, he played many matches as regular defensive midfielder with Yoshiharu Ueno. In 2007, he played all matches as defensive midfielder without one match for suspension. In 2008, although he could not play for injury until summer, he played many matches from summer. From 2009, his opportunity to play decreased and he resigned end of 2010 season.

In 2011, Kawai moved to J2 League club Consadole Sapporo (later Hokkaido Consadole Sapporo). In 2011 season, he played many matches as center-back with Tatsuya Yamashita until summer and defensive midfielder with Hiroki Miyazawa from summer. Consadole won the 3rd place and was promoted to J1. Although he played as defensive midfielder in 2012 season, Consadole finished at the bottom place and was relegated to J2. From 2014, he played many matches as center back. In 2016, although his opportunity to play decreased, Consadole won the champions in J2 and was promoted to J1. In 2018, he could not play at all in the match and retired end of 2018 season. He was 40 years old.

Club statistics

J.League Firsts
 Appearance: May 22, 2000. Urawa Reds 6 vs 0 Omiya Ardija, Omiya Park Soccer Stadium
 Goal: April 2, 2005. Yokohama F. Marinos 4 vs 1 Albirex Niigata, Nissan Stadium

References

External links

Profile at Yokohama F. Marinos 
Profile at Hokkaido Consadole Sapporo

1978 births
Living people
Association football people from Tokyo
Japanese footballers
J1 League players
J2 League players
Urawa Red Diamonds players
Yokohama F. Marinos players
Hokkaido Consadole Sapporo players
Association football defenders
Association football midfielders